Pascual Pistarini (6 October 1915 – 2 October 1999) was an Argentine equestrian and general. He competed in two events at the 1948 Summer Olympics.

References

External links
 

1915 births
1999 deaths
Argentine male equestrians
Olympic equestrians of Argentina
Equestrians at the 1948 Summer Olympics
People from Río Cuarto, Córdoba
Sportspeople from Córdoba Province, Argentina